Maciej Rataj (19 February 1884 – 21 June 1940) was a Polish politician and writer.

Biography
Born in the village of Chłopy, near Lwów (now Lviv, Ukraine), on 19 February 1884, he attended a gymnasium in Lwów and studied classical linguistics at the University of Lwów. Upon the completion of his studies he became a gymnasium teacher first in Lwów, and later in Zamość. He became involved in politics after the Second Polish Republic gained independence following the First World War. He was a member of the Polish People's Party "Piast" political party, and, from 1931, a member of the People's Party. He became president of the Stronnictwo and the chief editor of the party's official paper, the 'Zielony Sztandar' in 1935. From 1919 to 1930, and from 1934 to 1935, he was a member of parliament for the Sejm (Polish Parliament), and from 1922 to 1928 he was the Marshal of the Sejm. Between 1920 and 1921 he was the Minister of Religion and Public Education, and took part in work on the March Constitution.

He was President of Poland twice: first in December 1922, as Acting President of the Republic of Poland for one week, after the assassination of president Gabriel Narutowicz, and again in May 1926, following Józef Piłsudski's May Coup and the resignation of president Stanisław Wojciechowski. His second term lasted half of a month. On both occasions, he oversaw special election and appointed new governments. In December 1939 he was arrested by Nazi Germany and executed in Palmiry during the German AB-Aktion operation in Poland.

Works 
 Pamiętniki (Memoirs) (1965)
 Wskazania obywatelskie i polityczne: Wybór pism i przemówień z lat 1919–1938 (1987)
 Maciej Rataj o parlamentaryzmie, państwie demokratycznym i sanacji (1998)

References

External links

1884 births
1940 deaths
People from Lviv Oblast
People from the Kingdom of Galicia and Lodomeria
Polish Austro-Hungarians
Polish People's Party "Piast" politicians
People's Party (Poland) politicians
Presidents of Poland
Marshals of the Sejm of the Second Polish Republic
Executed presidents
Polish people executed by Nazi Germany
Government ministers of Poland
University of Lviv alumni